The Commonwealth (Adultery) Act of May 1650 was an act of the English Rump Parliament. It imposed the death penalty for incest and adultery, and three months' imprisonment for fornication. It did not apply to women whose husbands were absent for more than three years and not known to be living. Like other legislation passed by the Commonwealth of England, the act was repealed following the Restoration of the Monarchy in 1660. In the history of adultery in English law, the Act represents the only time since the twelfth century when adultery has been outlawed in secular statute law.

References

External links
 Commonwealth (Adultery) Act 1650

Repealed British legislation